Vinnytsia Oblast (also referred to as Vinnychchyna, is an oblast in west-central Ukraine. Its administrative center is Vinnytsia. The oblast has a population of

History
Vinnytsia Oblast, first established on February 27, 1932, originally comprised raions (regions) of the following former okruhas of Ukraine (districts of Soviet Ukraine):
 Uman Okruha
 Berdychiv Okruha
 Vinnytsia Okruha
 Mohyliv Okruha
 Tulchyn Okruha
 Shepetivka Okruha
 Proskuriv Okruha
 Kamianets Okruha

In 1935 bordering territories of the oblast were transformed into Soviet border districts: Shepetivka Okrug, Proskuriv Okrug, and Kamianets Okrug. In 1937 the Kamianets Oblast, based on the border districts, was formed (it later became Khmelnytsky Oblast).

During World War II the occupying Axis powers split the territory of Vinnytsia Oblast between the General District Shitomir (Zhytomyr in Reichskommissariat Ukraine) and the Transnistria Governorate of the Kingdom of Romania.
In October 1941 the Romanians established a concentration camp in the oblast, it detained mostly Jews.

Geography

The oblast is located in the central part of the Right Bank Ukraine and borders seven other administrative oblasts of Ukraine. Along the southwest of the oblast the Dniester river passes.

The Vinnytsia oblast has appreciable mineral deposits and other exploitable raw materials. There are 1,159 deposits and other various mineral resources, tens of peat deposits, unique deposits of granite and kaolin, garnet and fluorite that have been explored. The raw kaolin deposits are the world largest, containing 800 million tons. Furthermore, a number of medicinal mineral springs have been found in the oblast, with health benefits comparable to the radon springs found in the town of Khmilnyk.

The unique decorative qualities of Vinnytsia's granites, sorbites, vinnytsites, and charnockites are used to manufacture stone, facing slabs, window sills, monuments, etc. Three granite deposits (consisting of 10 million cubic metres; 13 million cubic yards) have been explored and are mined, and experimental mining is carried out in eight other deposits. Multiple enterprises have been utilizing these  resources for more than a century.  

The Vinnytsia oblast is the only oblast of Ukraine containing large pelicanite resources (39 deposits with the total inferred resources of about 170 million tons).

The lignite, commonly known as brown coal, found in Vinnytsia is similar in quality to the well-known lignite of Dniprobas and can be used for energy purposes utilizing the semi-coking and hydrogenation methods. Three lignite deposits in the oblast, containing about 50 million tons, have been preliminarily explored and an additional three deposits are in the exploration stage.

The building materials industry widely uses local sand and gravel. There are five sand deposits, all of which are exploited, of which one is used for silicate bricks, three for building mortars and one for ballast.

The town of Khmilnyk in Vinnytsia is home to a popular radon mineral spring, whose therapeutic properties have been ascertained and utilized for numerous health benefits. Also 21 table water springs have been prospected, ten of which have been certified and at five filling has already been arranged ("Rehina", "Kniazhna", "Shumylivska", "Podilska" and "Rosiana"). Also, "Myrhorodska" type mineral water has been found. It is probable that there are many more radon deposits in the oblast that, once found, can be exploited.

Bauxite, the ore used aluminum manufacturing, has recently been discovered in Podillia. Geologists estimate that this deposit contains about 3 million tons of ore.

Historical Sites
The old historical castles in Bar, Ukraine attract a big number of domestic visitors and foreign tourists every year, including: 
 St. Pokrovsky Orthodox Church;
 St. Anna Roman Catholic Cathedral;
 St. Pokrovsky Monastery;
 Old Fortress.

The city of Bar is a popular tourist location because it is where the mathematician Viktor Bunyakovsky was born.

The following sites were nominated for the Seven Wonders of Ukraine.
 The Villa of Mykola Pyrogov
 Nemyriv Scythian settlement
 Ancient Slavic cave temple (Bushi relief)

The Podillya's folk icon-painting tradition is well known in Ukraine. Its manifestation are long home iconostases painted on canvas in the end of the 19th - beginning of the 20th cc. Red, green and yellow colours are prevailing, the faces of the saints depicted are a little bit long, their eyes are almond-like. On these iconostases, the most worshipped family saints were painted. The collections of Podillya's folk iconostases are possessed by Vynnytsya Art Museum and The Museum of Ukrainian Home Icons in the Radomysl Castle.

Economics

Industry

The oblast's industrial potential is represented by such enterprises as the Ladyzhyn thermal power station, associations "Zhovten", "Infrakon", "Maiak", "Krystal", "Vinnytsia Bearing Works", "Khimprom", tens of processing and light industry enterprises. In all about 400 enterprises of various industrial sectors are functioning in the oblast. The largest of them are situated in the oblast capital.

The Vinnytsia oblast has 12.7% of the industrial production potential, 2% of the cost of fixed production assets and 2.6% of the industrial output.

The oblast has a multisectoral industrial complex, where leading places are held by the food industry, machine building and metalworking.

Over 400 industrial enterprises of 13 industrial sectors are functioning in the oblast. Main of them are food industry (57.5%), electric power industry (15.6%), machine building and metalworking (9.4%), chemical and petrochemical industry (5.7). Microbiology and medicine are developing.

72 machine building enterprises are specialized in manufacture of products in 12 industrial sectors, the main of which are electrical engineering, machine tool and toolmaking, instrument engineering, bearing, tractor and farm machinery industries. The Vinnytsia oblast's machine building products include metal cutting tools, pumps, rolling bearings, water, gas and heat flow meters, electric motors, electric spindles, computer facilities, production equipment for processing industries, farm machinery for plant growing and animal husbandry, integrated circuits, semiconductor and vacuum electronic devices, high economy luminescent lamps, stereoanagraphs, scales, automobile lifters, mills, milking equipment, etc.

The share of consumer goods output in the oblast in their total production in Ukraine is of 5.7% (1996). They are manufactured by 359 enterprises.

The oblast specializes in production of foodstuffs. The total output of consumer goods in 1996 made 81.1%, domestic and recreational purpose goods 9.0% and light industry products 6.4%.

In the output of consumer foodstuffs in 1996 the Vinnytsia oblast was the second and of non food goods took the 11th place among the oblasts of Ukraine.

Main positions in the structure of production of domestic and recreational goods are held by products manufactured at enterprises of the machine building complex, chemical and defense industries: complex domestic facilities, small mechanization means for household plots and small holdings, domestic chemistry goods.

Among the light industry enterprises is of great use concluding agreements with foreign firms to manufacture goods from the raw material supplied by the customer of the products. Cooperation with firms of Germany, USA, Slovakia, Czech, Hungary, India and others has been established. In 1996 the Vinnytsia joint-stock company "Podillia", public joint stock company "Khmilnyk Garment Factory 'Lileia'", Vinnytsia public joint stock company "Volodarka", joint stock company "Tulchin Garment Factory" and others worked on raw materials supplied by the foreign firm's customers.

The electric power generating capacity of power plants at the oblast's territory is 10,523,400 kWh per year. At present, they are under loaded. The electric power generation in 1996 produced 3,548 kWh, while its consumption in the same year was 5,041,000 kWh.

The oblast has 39 sugar factories and 13 distilleries. A quite good base for processing sunflower seeds and groats crops has been formed.

Agriculture

The total farmland area is 19,605 square kilometres (7570 sq. mi.); of them, arable lands occupy 16,940 km² (6540 sq. mi.), and perennial plantations, 512 km² (198 sq. mi.).

As of 1 January 1997 in the oblast there were functioning 749 collective agricultural enterprises, 56 state farms of all systems, 25 inter farm agricultural enterprises, and 818 private (peasant's) farms.

Agricultural enterprises of all forms of ownership are primarily specialized in growing of cereal crops and sugar beets, the animal husbandry, meat and milk production. In the overall structure of sown areas, winter wheat crops occupy 18%, barley 14% and sugar beets 10%.

In 1996 the oblast produced 7% of grain, 14.3% of sugar beets, 7.5% of fruits and berries, 6.1% of meat in live weight, 5.4% of milk and 4.0% of eggs of their total production in Ukraine.

Transport and Communications

Three trunk pipelines cross the oblast's territory: Urengoi-Pomary-Uzhhorod, "Soiuz" and Dashava-Kyiv. 3,299.8 km (2050 miles) of gas distributing networks are in service. It was planned to put  of gas networks in operation in 1997.

Foreign Economic Relations

In 1996 enterprises and organizations of the oblast executed foreign trade operations with partners from 73 countries of the world. The total foreign trade volume for this period made $397,500,000, including export ($280,900,000) and import ($116,600,000), which resulted in positive balance ($164,300,000).

The oblast's foreign trade with CIS and Baltic countries in this time reached 58.2% of the total foreign trade turnover. The largest export deliveries are to the Russian Federation (42.6%), Belarus (5.4%), Belgium (7.2%) and Germany (7.45%).

No considerable changes have taken place in the structure of commodity exports. As before, leading in this field are the food industry (47.5%), light industry (14.18%), machine building (10.96%), chemical industry (5.09%) and agriculture (6.36%).

Enterprises of the Vinnytsia oblast seek to import urgently needed products which are in short supply. Main items of import in 1996 were mineral fertilizers (2.68%), petroleum products (10.27%), equipment (11.63%), surface transport facilities (3.82%), inorganic chemistry products, electrical machines, fabrics and yarn.

Taking into account main lines of production, considerable quantities of farm machinery and equipment for processing and building materials industries are brought to its territory. Owing to this agricultural enterprises of the oblast managed in 1996 to perform a full range of fieldwork and obtained a good harvest of cereal and industrial crops.

At the same time large quantities of products that are not in demand of population as well as goods manufactured in sufficient quantities by the oblast's enterprises are brought to the oblast. Moreover, a considerable amount of valuable raw leather is brought out on so called "tolling" terms in exchange of poor quality semi manufactures, footwear, leather jackets, etc.

Of special concern is the fact that enterprises of the oblast are steeply reducing import of the equipment, spare parts, completing items, while import of alcoholic drinks, juices, and other low grade consumer goods is rising. As shown by calculations, the oblast, having a considerable export/import potential, has real opportunities through an effective use of the foreign trade to increase revenues both of the local and of the state budget and to provide itself with the necessary "critical" products.

The oblast's enterprises seek to attract foreign investments for increasing the output of products. Since 1991 till December 1997 about 300 joint enterprises with foreign investments amounting to $23,300,000 were established in the Vinnytsia oblast. Enterprises and citizens from 41 countries of the world participated in organization of the enterprises. The largest amount of investments came from the USA, Germany, Poland, Israel and some other countries.

Oblast is one of the founding members of Euroregion Dniester.

Subdivisions 

The Vinnytsia Oblast was founded on February 27, 1932, its area makes 4.5% of the state's territory. Administratively the oblast's territory is divided into 6 districts (raions). The oblast has 17 cities, 30 towns and 1,467 villages.

Demographics

Age 
Overall
0-14 years: 14.9%  (male 124,640/female 117,422)
15-64 years: 68.1%  (male 531,953/female 571,923)
65 years and over: 17.0%  (male 88,770/female 185,245) (2013 official)
 Median
 total: 40.4 years 
 male: 37.1 years 
 female: 43.5 years  (2013 official)

Nomenclature

Most of Ukraine's oblasts are named after their capital cities, officially referred to as "oblast centers" (translit. oblasnyi tsentr). The name of each oblast is a relative adjective, formed by adding a feminine suffix to the name of respective center city: Vinnytsia is the center of the Vinnyts'ka oblast''' (Vinnytsia Oblast). Most oblasts are also sometimes referred to in a feminine noun form, following the convention of traditional regional place names, ending with the suffix "-shchyna" or "chyna", as is the case with the Vinnytsia Oblast, Vinnychchyna''.

See also
 Seven Wonders of Ukraine
 Subdivisions of Ukraine

References

External links

 
Oblasts of Ukraine
States and territories established in 1932
1932 establishments in Ukraine